The Sony Ericsson W910i is a slider model music phone. The W910i was announced on June 14, 2007, as a branded "Walkman phone" and uses version 3 of the 'Walkman Player'. The phone also features the shake control feature found on the W580 that enables music track switching by shaking the phone and also for Java ME based video games and applications using the JP-8.

The phone, alongside the K850 Cybershot and the more expensive W960 Walkman, was one of the first phones from the company to use the Sony Ericsson Media Manager which replaces the now-defunct File Manager seen on older models. The Walkman music software also uses the 'SensMe' feature which designates the mood depending on the genre and the speed of the track the user is playing. The phone has had its camera interface revamped and resembles the one seen on K850; however the BestPic feature has been replaced by Burst Mode.

The W910i is available in six different colors which have been advertised as "Hearty Red", "Noble Black", "Havana Bronze", "Prime Silver", "Lipstick Pink" and "Silky White". Included in certain retail configurations are a 1 GB or 2 GB capacity memory card. As well as the Walkman digital music player, the W910i can also play FM radio with features using RDS and GraceNote TrackID service.

On February 14, 2008, the W910 was given the GSM Association's "Best Handset 2008" award.

Stability issues

The Sony Ericsson W910i is known to crash and switch itself off intermittently. As of November 2009, firmware has yet to be released to fully resolve these issues, though some users have reported that later firmware versions have dramatically reduced the frequency of these issues occurring.

The phone itself has received much criticism for its instability, which include complaints about screen and system freezing, restarting and button input failures. Many reviews and user forums consistently note this as a major problem for the Sony Ericsson phone.

Technical specifications
 Walkman 3.0 Player (MP3/AAC/WMA/WAV), SensMe
 Java MIDP 2.0 with OpenGL ES and Motion Sensor support
 Video player with progressive fast forward and slow motion
 New 3 softkey interface layout with Call/End keys (A200 Platform), a software feature of Java Platform 8

Advertised battery life
 400hr standby time
 9hr talk time

Rear camera
 2-megapixel
 Maximum resolution (still image): 1600x1200 pixels
 2.5x digital zoom
 Video recording format: .MP4 (AAC audio)
 Video recording resolution: 320x240@15fps
 No flash

Front camera
 Video calling resolution: 176x144 or 128x96

Critical reception
CNET hardware reviewer Ella Morton wrote that there are some compatibility issues with Windows Media Player for the Walkman functions and criticized the shake and motion sensing function of the W910i but she concluded that "there is much to like beyond the quirky bits" giving it a rating of 8.2/10.

See also
Nokia N81
Nokia 5610 XpressMusic

External links 
 Sony Ericsson W910 announced GSMArena
 http://www.mobile-phones-uk.org.uk/sony-ericsson-w910i.htm

References 

W910i
Mobile phones introduced in 2007

pt:Sony Ericsson W910i